Amghishiya was a Sasanian city or fortress located near the former Lakhmid capital of al-Hira. It was known as a major defensive headquarter. In 633, during the Muslim conquest of Persia, a battle took place in one of its satellite military posts, Ullais, where the Muslim Arabs defeated a combined army of Sasanian-Christian Arab troops. Amghishiya was thereafter invaded and sacked by the Muslim military officer Khalid ibn al-Walid, while the survivors of the place fled to the countryside.

Sources 

 

Sasanian cities
Former populated places in Iraq